Muskhelishvili is a surname. Notable people with the surname include:

Mikheil Muskhelishvili, Georgian-French political scientist
Nikoloz Muskhelishvili, Georgian mathematician
 Rostom Muskhelishvili, Georgian  military officer